Steven Arthur Boylan (born September 30, 1965), formerly a U.S. military spokesman in Baghdad for General David Petraeus in the prosecution of the Iraq War troop surge of 2007 from February, 2007 to September, 2008.  After leaving Iraq, he became the public affairs officer and the senior public affairs observer/trainer for the Battle Command Training Program (BCTP) at Fort Leavenworth, Kansas, according to U.S. News & World Report.

Personal life
Boylan is the son of Louis and Barbara Boylan.

Boylan is a 1980 graduate of Pompano Beach High School in Pompano Beach, Florida. The Broward County school is the "Home of the Golden Tornadoes."

Boylan is a graduate of Mercer University in Macon, Georgia. He received a BA in communication, with a minors in journalism and broadcast and film, and an MA in management from Webster University.

Boylan's residence is in Kansas. His second wife is named Michelle. In September, 2007, Michelle Boylan wrote a letter to the editor of the Kansas City Star demanding that Congress apologize to General Petraeus for the treatment he received during testimony.  Michelle Boylan and the three Boylan children attended an event in Wisconsin by the Vice President in the 2004 presidential race.  They were interviewed as to why they were there, and Michelle responded that she felt it was important for her children to see the importance of the political process.

Career

Army
Boylan was commissioned as a 2nd lieutenant, (Branched Aviation) in the army from Army ROTC at Mercer University, June, 1984.

Completed Infantry Officer Basic Course, Ft. Benning, GA, and the Initial Entry Rotary Wing Course, Ft. Rucker, AL.

Boylan retired as a colonel in the United States Army.

Currently, Boylan works as an assistant instructor in Fort Leavenworth. 

"Colonel Boylan is a top 80% officer by today's military standards," -General David Petraeus, 2009.

Positions
 Chief, Media Operations, NORAD/US Space Command, Peterson AFB, Colorado, June, 1995-November, 1997.
 Division Aviation Officer, Ft. Carson, Colorado, November, 1997-February, 1998.
 Operations Officer, 4th Squadron, 3rd Armored Cavalry Regiment, Ft. Carson, February, 1998-June, 1999.
 Public Affairs Officer, US Army Japan and 9th Theater Support Command, July, 1999-July, 2002.
 Public Affairs Officer, 8th U.S. Army, August, 2002-July, 2004.
 Spokesperson, U.S. Military in Iraq, 2004–2005.
 Director of the Combined Press Information Center (CPIC), August, 2004-December, 2005.
 Director of Strategic Communication, Combined Arms Center, Ft. Leavenworth, KS, January 2006-February 2007.
 Public Affairs Officer to the Commanding General Multi-National Force-Iraq, Baghdad, February 2007 – October 2008.
 Public Affairs Officer and Senior Public Affairs Observer/Trainer, Battle Command Training Program, Ft. Leavenworth, KS, November 2008 – present.

Decorations and badges

Non-U.S. service medals and ribbons

 ( Multinational Force and Observers Medal ribbon) (with award numeral "2")

Foreign badges

 ( Honduran Parachutist Badge)

2002 stabbing
Boylan was attacked on the night of December 15, 2002 outside Seoul, South Korea's Yongsan Garrison, the headquarters of the United States Forces Korea. According to his statement to police, he was attacked by three Korean men in their twenties, who cursed at him in English, pushed him from behind, and stabbed him with a 5-inch blade. He received a cut on his left side, below the ribcage, for which he was treated at a base hospital; he did not require stitches. Boylan had come to public attention in South Korea for his role as the army spokesman regarding the June 13, 2002 roadside accident in which a U.S. Army armored vehicle struck and killed two South Korean girls.

Greenwald emails
In late October 2007, Boylan became embroiled in a dispute with Glenn Greenwald of Salon Magazine over articles by Greenwald related to the prosecution of the Iraq War by the George W. Bush presidency and a series of emails.  Boylan has stated that he did not send the email in question, claiming that it was sent by an imposter.  Prior to the incident, evidence had surfaced of Boylan being impersonated via email.

Memberships and awards
 Member, Alpha Alpha Chapter, Pi Kappa Phi fraternity, Mercer University, initiated April 15, 1981.  He was the chapter's 257th initiate.
 St. Michael Medal, bronze, 1999.  (Members of the Order of St. Michael are selected via a nomination process by the Army Aviation Association of America.)

References

External links
 Web page for participants in Ethics In America conference, with Boylan biography
 Video segment from "The complete story" April 5: Lt. Colonel Steven A Boylan discusses his frustration with the media not getting "the complete story" out of Iraq. Editor James Taranto responds
 Gray Beverley, "Mercer Grad Working With Media To Share Iraq Story," Georgia News Service/Macon Telegraph, September 12, 2005
 "Petraeus Loses Valuable Aide," Washington Whispers/U.S. News & World Report, September 12, 2008

1965 births
Living people
People from Pompano Beach, Florida
Mercer University alumni
Webster University alumni
Recipients of the Legion of Merit
American Master Army Aviators
United States Army colonels